State Route 151 (SR 151) is a  state highway that runs southwest-to-northeast through portions of Walker and Catoosa counties in the northwestern part of the U.S. state of Georgia. The route connects the LaFayette area with the southeastern part of the Chattanooga, Tennessee area.

Route description
SR 151 begins at an intersection with US 27/SR 1, south of LaFayette, in the southern part of Walker County, just north of the Chattooga County line. The road heads northeast to the unincorporated community of Naomi, where it intersects SR 136. The two highways have a short concurrency. After the concurrency ends, SR 151 continues to the northeast and enters Catoosa County. In Ringgold, SR 151 has an interchange with Interstate 75 (I-75). Almost immediately afterward is a brief concurrency with US 41/US 76/SR 2/SR 3. SR 151 departs to the north and continues until it meets its northern terminus, the Tennessee state line, where the roadway continues as Tennessee State Route 321.

SR 151 is not part of the National Highway System, a system of roadways important to the nation's economy, defense, and mobility.

Major intersections

Ringgold spur route

State Route 151 Spur (SR 151 Spur) is an  spur route that carries US 41 Truck and US 76 Truck around an  railroad bridge in Ringgold. The route begins along Evitt Street and travels to the north. Across from the intersection with Vermont Street, the Ringgold Fire Station can be found. The fire department property ends across from the wye intersection with Kittle Street, where the road makes a reverse curve closer to the railroad tracks. The routes make a left turn at High Street and immediately have a grade crossing with the tracks. Only two other intersections exist along this segment (North Street, and Depot Street) before SR 151 Spur finally ends at the SR 151 mainline at the Ringgold City Hall.

See also

References

External links

 Georgia Roads (Routes 141 - 160)

151
Transportation in Walker County, Georgia
Transportation in Catoosa County, Georgia